Udechukwu is an African surname. Notable people with the surname include:

Ada Udechukwu (born 1960), Nigerian artist and poet
Obiora Udechukwu (born 1946), Nigerian painter and poet

Surnames of Nigerian origin